Empress Xiaoherui (20 November 1776 – 23 January 1850), of the Manchu Bordered Yellow Banner Niohuru clan, was a posthumous name bestowed to the wife and second empress consort of Yongyan, the Jiaqing Emperor. She was empress consort of Qing from 1801 until her husband's death in 1820, after which she was honoured as Empress Dowager Gongci during the reign of her step-son, Mianning, the Daoguang Emperor. She was the longest-serving empress consort in Qing history.

Life

Family background
Empress Xiaoherui's personal name was not recorded in history.

 Father: Gūnggala, served as the Minister of Works from 1810 to 1811, the Minister of War from 1811 to 1812 and the Minister of Rites from 1804 to 1810 and from 1812 to 1813, and held the title of a first class duke
 Paternal grandfather: Gongbao
 Paternal grandmother： Lady Nara
 Mother: Lady Yehe Nara
 Maternal grandfather: Baiming
 One elder brother and two younger brothers
 First elder brother: Ningwutai (宁武泰)
 First younger brother: Heshitai (和世泰), served as a Minister of Works in 1819
 Second younger brother: Jiluntai (吉伦泰)
 Two younger sisters 
First younger sister: Primary Princess Consort Ruiqin of the First Rank (wife of Duan'en)
Second younger sister:

Qianlong era
The future Empress Xiaoherui was born on the tenth day of the tenth lunar month in the 41st year of the reign of the Qianlong Emperor, which translates to 20 November 1776 in the Gregorian calendar.

In 1790, Lady Niohuru became a secondary consort of Yongyan, the 15th son of the Qianlong Emperor. She gave birth on 2 August 1793 to his seventh daughter, who would die prematurely in July or August 1795, and on 6 August 1795 to his third son, Miankai.

Jiaqing era
On 9 February 1796, the Qianlong Emperor abdicated in favour of Yongyan and became a Retired Emperor, while Yongyan was enthroned as the Jiaqing Emperor. On 12 February 1796, Lady Niohuru was granted the title "Noble Consort".

When the Jiaqing Emperor's primary consort, Empress Xiaoshurui, died of illness on 5 March 1797, the Noble Consort was placed in charge of the imperial harem as the highest rank concubine in that time, and was elevated to "Imperial Noble Consort". The Jiaqing Emperor wanted to make the Imperial Noble Consort his new empress consort but had to wait until the mourning period for Empress Xiaoshurui was over. The Qianlong Emperor died on 7 February 1799 so the Imperial Noble Consort's promotion to empress was delayed until 27 May 1801.

The Empress was put in charge of the upbringing of Minning, the Jiaqing Emperor's second son who was born to Empress Xiaoshurui. She took care of Minning and treated him well, and they shared a close and harmonious relationship.

On 9 March 1805, The Empress gave birth to the emperor's fourth son, Mianxin.

Daoguang era
When the Jiaqing Emperor died on 2 September 1820 before designating one of his sons as Crown Prince, the decision on the succession was left to Lady Niohuru, who became Empress dowager. The Empress dowager proclaimed Minning the new emperor before an imperial edict was officially issued. She ordered her servants to deliver the message to Minning, who was away in Chengde at the time. Minning rushed back to the Forbidden City and was enthroned as the Daoguang Emperor.

The Daoguang Emperor was extremely pleased with the Empress dowager's decision to make him emperor, claiming that she was broad-minded because she did not misuse her power to name either of her two sons as the new emperor. The Daoguang Emperor also granted her the title "Empress Dowager Gongci". She moved to the Forbidden City's Palace of Longevity and Health, which was traditionally a residence of the emperor's mother.

In 1836, Empress Dowager Gongci celebrated her 60th birthday. The Daoguang Emperor donned his formal court regalia for the occasion. He first went to the Hall of Central Harmony, where he read a memorial for the Empress dowager to wish her well. He then mounted a cart and rode through the right Wing Gate to the left Gate of Eternal Health, where he disembarked. Carrying the memorial in his hands, the Emperor was accompanied by an entourage of nobles and high-ranking officials. After the Emperor delivered his message and birthday gifts, the retinue jointly presented Empress Dowager Gongci with a court scepter.

On 10 April 1838, Empress Dowager Gongci and the Daoguang Emperor visited the Western Qing tombs for 13 days.

Empress Dowager Gongci died on 23 January 1850. She was posthumously granted the title "Empress Xiaoherui", and was interred in a separate tomb near the Chang Mausoleum of the Western Qing tombs.

Titles
 During the reign of the Qianlong Emperor (r. 1735–1796):
 Lady Niohuru (from 20 November 1776)
 Secondary consort (from 1790)
 During the reign of the Jiaqing Emperor (r. 1796–1820):
 Noble Consort (from 12 February 1796), third rank consort
 Imperial Noble Consort (from 14 June 1797), second rank consort
 Empress (from 27 May 1801)
 During the reign of the Daoguang Emperor (r. 1820–1850):
 Empress Dowager Gongci (from 2 September 1820)
 Empress Xiaoherui (from 12 April 1850)

Issue
 As secondary consort:
 The Jiaqing Emperor's seventh daughter (2 August 1793 – 16 July 1795)
 Miankai (6 August 1795 – 18 January 1838), the Jiaqing Emperor's third son, granted the title Prince Dun of the Second Rank in 1819, elevated to Prince Dun of the First Rank in 1821, posthumously honoured as Prince Dunke of the First Rank
 As Empress:
 Mianxin (9 March 1805 – 27 September 1828), the Jiaqing Emperor's fourth son, granted the title Prince Rui of the First Rank in 1819, posthumously honoured as Prince Ruihuai of the First Rank

In fiction and popular culture
 Portrayed by Poon Sin-yi in The Rise and Fall of Qing Dynasty (1988)
 Portrayed by Rebecca Chan in War and Beauty (2004)
 Portrayed by Sun Yifei in Legend of Jiaqing (2005)
 Portrayed by Gigi Wong in Curse of the Royal Harem (2011)
 Portrayed by Selena Lee in Succession War (2018)

See also
 Ranks of imperial consorts in China#Qing
 Royal and noble ranks of the Qing dynasty

Notes

References
 
 
 
 
 
 
 

1776 births
1850 deaths
Qing dynasty empresses
Consorts of the Jiaqing Emperor
Qing dynasty empresses dowager
Manchu nobility
18th-century Chinese women
18th-century Chinese people
19th-century Chinese women
19th-century Chinese people